The Phibsoo Wildlife Sanctuary is the second-smallest national park in Bhutan, covering  in western Sarpang District and southeastern Dagana District along the border with West Bengal. It is connected to Jigme Singye Wangchuck National Park and Royal Manas National Park via a "biological corridor" that crosses a national highway. It is separated from the border with India by two rivers, the Sunkosh River to the west and the Sanathang River to the east. The park is recovering from the scars of the ’90s. In those years, when the country had internal problems with the militia, that is why the park only came to life in 2009. 

The altitude of the terrain is from 200 to 1600 meters.

Flora and fauna

Phibsoo is unique in Bhutan for its chital (Axis axis, "spotted deer") and natural sal (Shorea robusta) forests. Like Royal Manas National Park, Phibsoo is inhabited by elephants, bengal tigers, gaur, three species of mahseer, and possibly the rare Ganges river dolphin. Phibsoo, however, has no human residents.

See also
 List of protected areas of Bhutan

References

Wildlife sanctuaries of Bhutan
Protected areas of Bhutan
Dagana District
Sarpang District